David Reiss Knehr (born November 3, 1996) is an American professional baseball pitcher for the San Diego Padres of Major League Baseball (MLB).

Amateur career
Knehr was born in Manhasset, New York and grew up in Glen Head, New York. He attended St. Dominic High School in Oyster Bay, New York.

Knehr played college baseball at Fordham University for three seasons, playing both as pitcher and as a shortstop. He was named to the Atlantic 10 Conference All-Rookie Team after leading the Rams with a 2.25 ERA with 37 strikeouts in 36 innings pitched. Following his freshman year, Knehr pitched for the Westhampton Aviators of the Hamptons Collegiate Baseball League and was named the league's Pitcher of the Year. As a junior, Knehr went 6-3 on the mound with a 2.40 ERA, 93 strikeouts and a 1.33 WHIP in 90 innings pitched. In 2017, he played collegiate summer baseball with the Chatham Anglers of the Cape Cod Baseball League.

Professional career
Knehr was selected in the 20th round of the 2018 Major League Baseball draft by the San Diego Padres. After signing with the team, he was initially assigned to the rookie-level Arizona League Padres before being promoted to the Single-A Fort Wayne TinCaps of the Midwest League. Knehr spent the 2019 season with the High-A Lake Elsinore Storm of the California League and went 3-5 with a 5.43 ERA, 83 strikeouts and a 1.49 WHIP in 66.1 innings pitched. After the season, the Padres sent him to the Arizona Fall League, where he played for the Peoria Javelinas.

Knehr did not play in a game in 2020 due to the cancellation of the minor league season because of the COVID-19 pandemic. Knehr was named to the Padres' 2021 Spring Training roster as a non-roster invitee and entered the season as the organization's 24th-ranked prospect by MLB.com. He was assigned to the Double-A San Antonio Missions to begin the year. 

On July 9, 2021, Knehr was selected to the 40-man roster and promoted to the major leagues for the first time. He made his MLB debut that day as the starting pitcher against the Colorado Rockies, pitching 3.2 innings of two-run ball. In the game, he also recorded his first career strikeout, striking out Rockies outfielder Raimel Tapia.

References

External links

Fordham Rams bio

1996 births
Living people
People from Manhasset, New York
Sportspeople from Nassau County, New York
Baseball players from New York (state)
Major League Baseball pitchers
San Diego Padres players
Fordham Rams baseball players
Chatham Anglers players
Arizona League Padres players
Fort Wayne TinCaps players
Lake Elsinore Storm players
Peoria Javelinas players
San Antonio Missions players
El Paso Chihuahuas players